Father Cigarette (Spanish: El padre Pitillo) is a 1955 Spanish-Portuguese comedy film directed by Juan de Orduña and starring Valeriano León, Virgilio Teixeira and Margarita Andrey. It was based on a play by Carlos Arniches, which had previously been turned into a 1946 Chilean film of the same title.

The film's sets were designed by Sigfrido Burmann. It was released by the large CIFESA studio.

Plot 
Don Froilán, the grouchy priest of a small village, and his sister Camila help Rosita who has become pregnant and banned to return home by her step-father, while the responsible, the son of the richest family, is to be sent away to the city.

Cast
 Valeriano León as Don Froilán 'Padre Pitillo'  
 Virgilio Teixeira 
 Margarita Andrey 
 Aurora Redondo 
 José Nieto 
 José Sepúlveda 
 Josefina Serratosa
 Ramón Martori 
 Joan Capri 
 Modesto Cid

References

Bibliography 
 Bentley, Bernard. A Companion to Spanish Cinema. Boydell & Brewer 2008.

External links 
 

1955 comedy films
Spanish comedy films
Portuguese comedy films
1955 films
1950s Spanish-language films
Films based on works by Carlos Arniches
Films directed by Juan de Orduña
Films scored by Juan Quintero Muñoz
Portuguese black-and-white films
Spanish black-and-white films
1950s Spanish films